Guang Prefecture (光州) was a prefecture of imperial China centered on modern Huangchuan County, Henan. It was created in the 6th century under the Liang dynasty and existed intermittently until 1913, after the establishment of the Republic.

Geography
The administrative region of Guangzhou in the Tang dynasty is in the border area between modern southeastern Henan and western Anhui (as well as northeastern Hubei). It probably includes parts of modern: 
 Under the administration of Xinyang, Henan:
 Huangchuan County
 Guangshan County
 Xin County
 Shangcheng County
 Gushi County
 Under the administration of Lu'an, Anhui:
 Jinzhai County

References
 

Prefectures of the Sui dynasty
Prefectures of the Tang dynasty
Prefectures of Yang Wu
Prefectures of Southern Tang
Prefectures of Later Zhou
Prefectures of the Song dynasty
Prefectures of the Yuan dynasty
Prefectures of the Ming dynasty
Prefectures of the Qing dynasty
Former prefectures in Henan
Former prefectures in Anhui